Riad Chibani (born 27 January 1964) is an Algerian judoka. He competed in the men's middleweight event at the 1988 Summer Olympics.

References

External links
 

1964 births
Living people
Algerian male judoka
Olympic judoka of Algeria
Judoka at the 1988 Summer Olympics
Place of birth missing (living people)
21st-century Algerian people